The year 2018 will be the 15th year in the history of the Konfrontacja Sztuk Walki, a mixed martial arts promotion based in Poland. 2018 began with KSW 42.

List of events

Title fights

KSW 42: Khalidov vs. Narkun

'KSW 42: Khalidov vs. Narkun' billed as being "champion vs. champion" was a mixed martial arts event held by Konfrontacja Sztuk Walki on March 3, 2018 at the Atlas Arena in Łódź, Poland.

Background 
Chris Fields did not reach Lodz because of storm Emma in Ireland, Iran's Hatef Moeil has stepped in to replace the Irishman and the contest has been switched to heavyweight.

Bonus awards

The following fighters were awarded bonuses:
 Fight of the Night: Tomasz Narkun vs. Mamed Khalidov
 Knockout of the Night: Scott Askham
 Submission of the Night: Tomasz Narkun

Results

KSW 43: Soldić vs. Du Plessis

'KSW 43: Soldić vs. Du Plessis' was a mixed martial arts event held by Konfrontacja Sztuk Walki on April 14, 2018 at the Centennial Hall in Wroclaw, Poland.

Background 
Bonus awards

The following fighters will be awarded bonuses:
 Fight of the Night: David Zawada vs. Michał Michalski
 Knockout of the Night: Dricus du Plessis & Damian Janikowski
 Submission of the Night: David Zawada

Results

KSW 44: The Game

'KSW 44: The Game' was a mixed martial arts event held by Konfrontacja Sztuk Walki on June 9, 2018 at the Ergo Arena in Gdańsk, Poland.

Background 
The original co-main event featured the rematch between Marcin Wrzosek and Kleber Koike Erbst for the vacant featherweight title. However Wrzosek suffered a pectoral muscle tear and was forced out of the rematch. As a result, Marian Ziolkowski stepped in against Erbst in a catchweight fight.

Bonus awards

The following fighters were awarded bonuses:
 Fight of the Night: Daniel Torres vs. Filip Wolański  
 Knockout of the Night: Erko Jun
 Submission of the Night: Kleber Koike Erbst

Results

KSW 45: The Return to Wembley

'KSW 45: The Return to Wembley' was a mixed martial arts event held by Konfrontacja Sztuk Walki on October 6, 2018 at the Wembley Arena in London, England.

Background 
Michal Andryszak got injured, Thiago Silva steps in on short notice to replace Andryszak against James McSweeney.

John Smith withdrew from his bout with Akop Szostak. Akop Szostak (3-2) will now face Jamie Sloane, who step in on less than two weeks’ notice.

Max Nunes no-showed KSW's fight week obligations, Lukasz Parobiec steps up on two days' notice to face Wagner Prado.

Akop Szostak vs. Jamie Sloane ruled a no-contest following an accidental eye poke in the first round.

Bonus awards

The following fighters will be awarded bonuses:
 Fight of the Night: Roberto Soldić vs. Dricus du Plessis
 Knockout of the Night: Wagner Prado and Scott Askham
 Submission of the Night: Phil De Fries

Results

KSW 46: Narkun vs. Khalidov 2

'KSW 46: Narkun vs. Khalidov 2' was a mixed martial arts event held by Konfrontacja Sztuk Walki on December 1, 2018 at the Gliwice Arena in Gliwice, Poland.

Background 
Borys Mańkowski suffered an injury during training and was forced to withdraw from his fight against Bruce Souto. The bout was canceled.

Also a severe hand injury forced Gracjan Szadziński to withdraw from his showdown with Marian Ziółkowski, Grzegorz Szulakowski stepped in on a short notice to face Ziółkowski.

Bonus awards

The following fighters will be awarded bonuses:
 Fight of the Night:  Tomasz Narkun vs. Mamed Khalidov and Romaz Szymanski vs. Daniel Torres 
 Knockout of the Night: Roberto Soldić and Krystian Kaszubowski

Results

References

External links
KSW 

2018 in mixed martial arts
Konfrontacja Sztuk Walki events
Konfrontacja Sztuk Walki events